Elatia, until 1927 known as Kalyvia Koutra or Kara Dere, is a forest village in Northern Greece near the border with Bulgaria. It is the administrative center of the Karantere forest. The settlement, which became part of the community of Sidironero in 1927, was dissolved in 1940.

History
After the Russo-Turkish War the village of Elatia (Kalyvia Koutra or Karadere) remained within the borders of the Ottoman Empire and its population consisted of Pomaks and occasionally some Sarakatsani families who used to stay there in summers. It was acceded to Greece after World War I. Its name was changed to Elatia (Ελατιά) in 1927. The village was depopulated in the period 1919–1934, most probably in 1923 as a result of the Treaty of Lausanne. Since then the village remained a place for Sarakatsani in the summers, and nowadays it serves as a center of the forestry enterprise of Elatia mountain and as a tourist station and mountain refuge.

References

External links
Καρά-ντερε (Ελατιά) 
Δάσος Ελατιάς (Καρά ντερέ) 
Καράντερε (Μαύρο ρέμα) 

Chech
Populated places in Drama (regional unit)